Dariel Albo Miranda (born ) is a Cuban male volleyball player. He is part of the Cuba men's national volleyball team. He didn't play in Rio Olympics in 2016 for being one of the six players of the Cuban national volleyball team that were remanded into custody suspected of committing aggravated rape in July 2016 in Tampere, Finland. In September 2016, he was the only one acquitted.

Awards

National team
 2016 Pan-American Volleyball Cup -  Gold Medal

References

External links
 profile at FIVB.org

1992 births
Living people
Cuban men's volleyball players
Place of birth missing (living people)
Pan American Games medalists in volleyball
Pan American Games silver medalists for Cuba
Volleyball players at the 2011 Pan American Games
PAOK V.C. players
Medalists at the 2011 Pan American Games